Justice Hawkins may refer to:

Alvin Hawkins, associate justice of the Tennessee Supreme Court
Armis E. Hawkins, associate justice of the Supreme Court of Mississippi
George Sydney Hawkins, associate justice of the Supreme Court of Florida
J. Harold Hawkins, associate justice of the Supreme Court of Georgia
W. A. Hawkins, associate justice of the Supreme Court of Georgia
William E. Hawkins, associate justice of the Texas Supreme Court